KCSI (95.3 FM) is a radio station broadcasting a country music format. Located in Red Oak, Iowa, United States, the station serves the Council Bluffs, Iowa area.  The station is licensed to Hawkeye Communications, Inc. and features programming from Fox News Radio .

References

External links

CSI